Yoboki is a town located in the western Dikhil Region of Djibouti.

History
Yoboki was established as a French military post in 1946, and buildings were constructed between July and November 1947 at the location of a well. The first meeting between the French soldiers, who began to occupy the territory, and representatives of the Sultan of Awsa, including Mahammad Yayyó, took place here. In 1958, a school was opened for the nomads. In 1979 a French teacher was kidnapped in Yoboki.

Bomb attacks by an unknown perpetrator were reported in mid-May 1990, which affected electric and military installations in the town. Due to conflict in the area between rebels and the government, since March 28, 1992 troops from the 5th Interarm Regiment of the French Overseas Navy have been deployed in Yoboki, Obock, and Tadjoura. The rebels were driven out to Gorabous. According to an October 1993 Amnesty International publication, "50 civilians were reportedly extrajudicially executed by government troops after a FRUD force withdrew from the village."

Demographics
In 1968, Yoboki had a population of around 200 residents, mostly Afar. More recent estimates indicate that the town has a population of 644.

Overview
Nearby towns and villages include Tew'o (10 km), Dikhil (59 km) and Galafi (40 km).

Geography and climate
Yoboki is located at an altitude of 250 meters above sea level in the hills, rising to 972 meters at Babba Alou. Yoboki National Park surrounds the town and Hanle Valley is in the vicinity. The area is prone to earthquakes and landslides.

Transport
Yoboki is well connected, linked by National Highway 1, National Highway 7 and National Highway 8; these roads lead to other cities such as Dikhil, Galafi, Dobi and Djibouti city.

Notable people
Moussa Mohamed Ahmed (1963-)

References

External links
 Satellite map at Maplandia.com
 Photograph

Populated places in Djibouti
Populated places established in 1946